Red Moon is a 2001 Italian crime-drama film directed by Antonio Capuano. It entered the competition at the 58th Venice International Film Festival.

Cast 
Carlo Cecchi: Antonino
Licia Maglietta: Irene
Toni Servillo: Amerigo
 Italo Celoro: Tony
 Domenico Balsamo: Oreste
 Antonia Truppo: Orsola
 Antonino Iuorio: Egidio
 Valeria Vaiano: Woman clan
 Lucia Ragni: Rita
 Susy Del Giudice: Elena
 Angela Pagano: Mariella
 Antonio Pennarella: Libero
 Stefania De Francesco: Libero's wife
 Luca Riemma: Frank

References

External links

2001 films
Italian crime drama films
Films about the Camorra
2001 crime drama films
Films directed by Antonio Capuano
2000s Italian films